Ole Amund Sveen (born 5 January 1990 in Gjøvik) is a Norwegian football forward who currently plays for Mjøndalen, joining from Bodø/Glimt on 2 October 2020.

He started his career in Redalen before joining Raufoss, a third-tier team. He was discovered and signed by Strømsgodset, for whom he played two league games in Tippeligaen 2012 and an additional two in Tippeligaen 2013. In 2013, he was also loaned out to Ham Kam, before playing two full seasons in Hødd. In 2016, he joined Sogndal, and started his first Norwegian Premier League game in March 2016 against Bodø/Glimt.

Sveen had been on trial with Sogndal as early as 2011.

Career statistics

Club

Honours

Club
Bodø/Glimt
Eliteserien (1):  2020

References

1990 births
Living people
Sportspeople from Gjøvik
Norwegian footballers
Raufoss IL players
Strømsgodset Toppfotball players
Hamarkameratene players
IL Hødd players
Sogndal Fotball players
FK Bodø/Glimt players
Mjøndalen IF players
Eliteserien players
Norwegian First Division players

Association football forwards